Luis Munive Escobar (June 21, 1920 − May 25, 2001) was a Mexican Roman Catholic bishop. Ordained to the priesthood on March 25, 1944, Munive Escobar was named bishop of the Roman Catholic Diocese of Tlaxcala, Mexico in 1959 and retired in 2001.

References

People from Tlaxcala
1920 births
2001 deaths
20th-century Roman Catholic bishops in Mexico